Charles Tulasne (5 September 1816 – 28 August 1884) was a French physician, mycologist and illustrator born in Langeais in the département of Indre-et-Loire.

He received his medical doctorate in 1840 and practiced medicine in Paris until 1854. Afterwards he worked with his older brother Louis René Tulasne (1815–1885) in the field of mycology. He died in Hyères, département of Var.

In addition to assisting his brother with the classification and study of fungi, Charles Tulasne collaborated with Louis on numerous scientific publications. He is known for his excellent illustrations, particularly in the three-volume Selecta Fungorum Carpologia. Regarding the artistic quality of his work, Charles Tulasne is sometimes referred to as "The Audubon of Fungi".

In 1872, Joseph Schröter circumscribed a genus of effused (patch-forming) fungi in the Tulasnellaceae family, Tulasnella was named in Tulasne's honour.

References
 Article on the Tulasne Brothers

19th-century French botanists
1816 births
1884 deaths
French mycologists
People from Indre-et-Loire
Botanical illustrators
19th-century French painters